Hilary Thompson ( "Hilarie" Thompson) is an American actress, known primarily for her character roles in popular television throughout the 1960s, 1970s, and 1980s.

Early years 
Born in Birmingham, Michigan, Thompson is the daughter of Elizabeth Thompson and sister of actress Victoria Thompson. She graduated from Hollywood High School in 1966. Her performance in the school's production of My Fair Lady when a talent scout was present led to her first film contract.

Career 
In 1966, Thompson made her television debut in a Kodak commercial aired during the Academy Awards.

On television, Thompson portrayed Lynn on Chico and the Man Lizabeth Barrett on The Manhunter, Lieutenant Betty Wheeler on Operation Petticoat, Sharon St. Clair on Number 96, Elizabeth Coates on The Young Rebels, and Ginger on Washingtoon. She also appeared on programs such as I Dream of Jeannie, Bewitched, Gunsmoke, The Flying Nun, Room 222, The Odd Couple, The Brady Bunch, Barnaby Jones, Harry O, Starsky and Hutch, Fantasy Island, ALF, and a number of movies, ranging from comedy to drama and suspense-thrillers.

Personal life
In 1988, at the age of 39, Thompson married actor, writer, director, and make-up effects artist, Alan Ormsby. They have a son, Austen.

Filmography

References

External links
 Fandango Movies and Actor Bio's
 
 

Actresses from Michigan
American film actresses
American television actresses
Living people
People from Birmingham, Michigan
20th-century American actresses
21st-century American women
Year of birth missing (living people)